The 2019 Aragon motorcycle Grand Prix was the fourteenth round of the 2019 MotoGP season. It was held at the Ciudad del Motor de Aragón in Alcañiz on 22 September 2019.

Classification

MotoGP

 Pol Espargaró suffered a broken left wrist in a crash during practice and withdrew from the event.

Moto2

 Adam Norrodin suffered a shoulder injury in a crash during practice and withdrew from the event.

Moto3

 Kaito Toba withdrew from the event after Friday practice due to a shoulder injury suffered during the previous round at Misano.

Championship standings after the race

MotoGP

Moto2

Moto3

Notes

References

External links

Aragon
Aragon Motorcycle Grand Prix
Aragon motorcycle Grand Prix
Aragon motorcycle Grand Prix